Vladimir Alekseyevich Konkin (born 19 August 1951, Saratov, USSR) is a Soviet/Russian cinema and theatre actor, who appeared in 45 films. He is best known for his roles in How the Steel Was Tempered (1975, Pavel Korchagin) and The Meeting Place Cannot Be Changed (1979, Vladimir Sharapov). Vladimir Konkin, a Meritorious Artist of Russia (2010), is also a published author of short stories and essays.

Biography 
Vladimir Konkin was born in Saratov, into the family of a railway engineer who served at the Privolzhskaya Railway. As a schoolboy Vladimir studied at the theatre studio courses of the actress and writer Natalia Sukhostav; upon graduation he enrolled into the Saratov Theatre college, the class of Dmitry Lyadov. In 1972 Konkin joined the Kharkhov Theatre for Children; a year later he moved to the Moscow Mossovet Theatre. Konkin debuted on the big screen in Nikolai Mashchenko’s How the Steel Was Tempered (1975), after Nikolai Ostrovsky's autobiographical novel, shot at the Kiev-based Dovzhenko Film Studios. The film made the young actor famous and earned him the Lenin Komsomol Prize. The actor has never lost the respect for his character, seeing him as the epitome of moral strength. "I love Korchagin and even today, at 60, I think I would have been on his side," he said in a 2011 interview.

In 1974–1978 Konkin appeared in several successful films, including Andrei Konchalovsky's A Lover's Romance, Boris Ivchenko's Marina, and Georgy Kalatozishvili's The Caucasian Story. Konkin has never served in the Army (due to poor health) but, somewhat ironically, played mostly the military men, invariably romantic, mild and intelligent. The part of Sharapov in Stanislav Govorukhin's The Meeting Place Cannot Be Changed (1979) marked the peak of Vladimir Konkin's cinema career. "The character of Sharapov hasn't lost its relevance. Regardless of whether we accept today's 'rules of the game', what we look for is straight honesty in those people who are there to protect us," Konkin asserted in a 2002 interview.

In 1979 Konkin joined the Moscow Ermolova Theatre (where he played young Vladimir Lenin in Kazan University) and continued to appear in films, notably Fathers and Sons (directed by Vyacheslav Nikiforov; as Arkady Kirsanov) and The Adventures of Tom Sawyer (Stanislav Govorukhin, as Doctor Robinson). During the 1980s and 1990s he worked in several theatres, including Taganka Theatre (Zakhar Bardin in Maxim Gorky's Enemies, 1995). In the late 1990s he hosted for a while the Home Library show at ORT. His best known role in the 2000s was that of Colonel Kobylyansky in the history drama Romanovs. The Crown.

Family 
Vladimir Konkin and his wife Alla Lvovna Konkina spent 39 years together. In 2010 she died of cancer. They had twin sons, Yaroslav and Svyatoslav, and a daughter Sophia who sadly drowned in a sports club pool on 24 September 2020.

Awards 
 The Lenin Komsomol Prize (for the role of Pavel Korchagin in How the Steel Was Tempered) - 1974
 The Interior Ministry of Russia's Prize (for the role of Vladimir Sharapov in The Meeting Place Cannot Be Changed) - 1999
 The Meritorious Artist of Ukraine
 The Meritorious Artist of Russia (2010)

Filmography
 Marina (1974)
 A Lover's Romance (Romans o vlyublyonnykh, 1974) - Sergey’s younger brother
 As The Steel Was Tempered (Kak zakalyalas stal, 1975) - Pavel Korchagin
 Let’s Move to Love (Perekhodim k lyubvi, 1975)
 Flight from the Palace (Pobeg iz dvortsa, 1975) - Revold
 Black Sea Waves (Volny tchyornovo morya, 1976)
 And Soldiers Were Marching On... (Aty-baty, shli soldaty..., 1976) - Lieutenant Suslin
 The Talent (Talant, 1977)
 Caucasian Tale (Kavkazskaya povest, 1978)
 A Road to Sophia (Put k Sofii, 1978)
 The Meeting Place Cannot Be Changed (Mesto vstrechi izmenit nelzya, 1979) - Lieutenant Sharapov
 Lucia Di Lammermoor (1980) - The composer
 The Adventures of Tom Sawyer (Priklyucheniya Toma Soiera, 1981) - Doctor Robinson
 Father And Sons (Otsy i deti, 1983) - Arkady Kirsanov
 The Night Is Followed by the Day (Za notchyu den idyot, 1984) - Yakov Batyuk
 Bagration (1985) - Prince Menshikov
 Aunt Marusia (Tyotya Marusia, 1985) - Pyotr
 The Singing Russia (Poyushchaya Rossia)
 The Appellation (Apellyatsia, 1987) - Kholmovoy
 Impatience of the Soul (Neterpenye dushi, 1987)
 Mudromer (1988) - Zalivako
 The Civil Suit (Grazhdansky isk, 1988) - Gorsky
 The Noble Outlaw Vladimir Dubrovsky (Blagorodny razboinik Vladimir Dubrovsky, 1988) - Shabashkin
 Asthenia Syndrome (Astenichesky sindrom, 1989)
 The Last Autumn (Poslednyaia osen, 1990) - Golubev
 The Lift for the In-between (Lift dlya promezhutochnovo tcheloveka, 1990) - Dubrovin
 Worst of All Evil (Ischadye ada, 1991)
 The Black Ocean (Tchornu okean, 1992) - Fokin
 But Is it Good to Sleep With Another Man’s Wife? (A spat s chuzhoy zhenoy khorosho?, 1992) - Shutov
 A Petty Romance (Bulvarny roman, 1994)
 Princess on Peas (Printsessa na bobakh, 1997) - Kostya
 One Has to Start Living Again (Opyat nadi zhit, 1999)
 A Night on the Border (Notch na kordone, 2001) - Painter Stepan Stepanovich
 Romanovs. The Crown Family (Romanovy. Ventsenosnaya semya, 2001) - Coloner Kobylinsky
 The Adventures of a Magician (Priklyuchenya maga, 2002) - Kursky
 The Operational Moniker (Operativny psevdonim, 2003) - Timokhin
 Sarmat (2004) - The criminal investigation officer
 The Time of Cruel Ones (Vremya zhestokhikh, 2004) - Ilyin 
 The First Circle (V Kruge Pervom, 2006) - Professor Varenev
 The Lenin's Will (Zaveshchaniye Lenina, 2007, TV series) - Yuri Nikolayevich

References

External links 
 

1951 births
Actors from Saratov
20th-century Russian male actors
Soviet male film actors
Russian male short story writers
Russian male essayists
Honored Artists of the Russian Federation
Russian television presenters
Living people
21st-century Russian male actors
Russian male film actors
Russian male stage actors